The Land's End Plantation in Stonewall, Louisiana, was established in 1835 by Colonel Henry and Ben Marshall, signer of the Louisiana Ordinance of Secession and the constitution of the Confederate States of America. The house, built in 1857, was used as a hospital following the Battle of Mansfield in 1864.

The plantation house, along with a  area comprising several buildings, was listed on the National Register of Historic Places on April 26, 1972.

The plantation house was completely destroyed by fire in 1989.

See also
National Register of Historic Places listings in DeSoto Parish, Louisiana

References

Houses on the National Register of Historic Places in Louisiana
Houses in DeSoto Parish, Louisiana
National Register of Historic Places in DeSoto Parish, Louisiana